Hezehburan (also Romanized as Hezehbūrān; also known as Hezārbarān and Hezehberān) is a village in Sard-e Sahra Rural District, in the Central District of Tabriz County, East Azerbaijan Province, Iran. At the 2006 census, its population was 962, in 266 families.

References 

Populated places in Tabriz County